The Jim Pattison Group is a Canadian conglomerate based in Vancouver. In a recent survey by the Financial Post, the firm was ranked as Canada's 62nd largest company. Jim Pattison, a Vancouver-based entrepreneur, is the chairman, CEO, and sole owner of the company. The Jim Pattison Group, Canada's second largest privately held company, has more than 45,000 employees worldwide, and annual sales of $10.1 billion based on investments in Canada, the U.S., Mexico, Europe, Asia and Australia. The Group is active in 25 divisions, according to Forbes, including packaging, food, forestry products.

In early 2022, the 93-year-old Pattison was still working full-time. According to Forbes, his net worth then was $5.7 billion, having increased substantially from the $2.1 billion reported in March 2009. In September 2020, a news item stated that "Jim Pattison Group Inc. had $10.9 billion in revenue and employed 48,000 people".

History

The Jim Pattison Group began on May 8, 1961, when Pattison purchased a General Motors automobile dealership by borrowing $40,000 from the Royal Bank of Canada, and placing his home and life insurance policy with the bank as collateral. Acquisitions in subsequent years included the following:

1965 – Awarded license to operate Vancouver AM radio station CJOR
1967 – Acquired Neon Products (Vancouver) & Seaboard Outdoor Advertising
1968 – Acquired Overwaitea Foods (Vancouver)
1969 – Acquired Provincial News (Edmonton)
Employees: 2,500  Sales: $100 million
1980 – Started Jim Pattison Real Estate Group
Employees: 6,000  Sales: $500 million
Purchased Beautiful British Columbia Magazine
1984 – Acquired Canadian Fishing Company
1985 – Acquired Ripley's Believe It or Not!
Employees: 6,000  Sales: $1 billion
1990 – Acquired the Foodservice Packaging Group
Acquired the Flexible Packaging Group
Acquired Coroplast and Montebello Packaging
Employees: 10,000  Sales: $2 billion
1991 – Started Jim Pattison Trade Group
Started Financial Services division
1994 – Acquired Westshore Terminals, a BC-based coal-export terminal facility
1995 – Acquired Buy-Low Foods
1997 – Started Select Media Services
Opened Ripley's Aquarium, Myrtle Beach, SC
1999 – Acquired Cooper's Foods
Employees: 20,000  Sales: $4.4 billion
2000 – Opened Ripley's Aquarium of The Smokies, Gatlinburg, TN
Employees: 22,000  Sales: $4.6 billion
2001 – Acquired Monarch Broadcasting
Acquired Van-Whole Produce
Employees: 24,000  Sales: $5 billion
2002 – Started ProLogix Distribution Services and AccuLogix Distribution Services
Acquired Ever Corp.
Employees: 25,000  Sales: $5.2 billion
2003 – Acquired LIN PAC Inc.
Employees: 26,000  Sales: $5.5 billion
2004 – Acquired Classic Attractions (Texas)
Acquired St. Augustine Sightseeing Trains (Florida)
Acquired Maltese Signs (Norcross, GA)
Acquired auto lease business of Cross-Canada Car Leasing Limited (Toronto, ON)
Acquired periodical distribution companies in San Jose and Chico, CA
Employees: 27,000  Sales: $5.7 billion
2005 – Acquired control of Icicle Seafoods (BC.) Inc.
Acquired Freeway Dodge Chrysler
Acquired Spartech Corporation's corrugated plastic sheet business
Started the Vancouver edition of 24 Hours (in partnership with Quebecor Media)
Formed or purchased interests in several US and Canadian joint ventures in the periodical industry
Employees: 28,000  Sales: $6.1 billion
2006 – Acquired Carthage Cup, Carthage, TX
Acquired Creative Outdoor Ads, Halifax, Nova Scotia
Acquired Island Radio Ltd.'s six FM stations on Vancouver Island
Acquired OK Radio Group Ltd.'s two FM stations in Victoria, BC
Acquired A&W Fixtures, Cocoa, Florida
Started Great Pacific Bank Limited, Warrens, Barbados
2007 – Disposed of interest in the Vancouver 24 Hours
2008 – Acquired Guinness World Records from HIT Entertainment
2009 – Funded the Peak Performance Project
2010 – Acquired Amc Billboard Co
2011 – Acquired Ocean Brands
October 29, 2013, Pattison became an insider of the Just Energy Group, a publicly traded corporation on both the Toronto Stock Exchange and the American Stock Exchange, by taking possession of more than 14 million shares (over 10% of the company's shares outstanding).
2013 – Acquired Sun-Rype
2014 – Purchased 5 John Deere Dealerships in Saskatchewan.
2015 – Employees: 39,000  Sales: $8.2 billion
2015 – Purchased Peterbilt Pacific Dealerships 
2017 – Amalgamated JayDee AGTECH and Maple Farm Equipment John Deere Dealerships as one company, Pattison Agriculture with 17 locations across Saskatchewan and Manitoba
2017 – Took controlling interest (March 23, 2017) of Quality Foods with 13 locations across Vancouver Island, British Columbia
2017 – Acquired Choices Markets from the Lockhart family to be operated as a division of Buy-Low Foods LP
2019 - Sold Sun-Rype to Lassonde Industries for C$80 million in an all-cash deal. As well, in announcing the sale, it was reported that Sun-Rype had C$164 million in gross sales for their fiscal year ended September 30, 2019, and C$9 million in EBITDA.
 2020 - acquired remaining magazine and book distribution business not previously held in Canada from Metro360 for $925,000.  The News Group is the only major distributor of periodicals in Canada.

Divisions
Some of the more significant divisions of the Jim Pattison Group include:

Illuminated Signs
 Pattison Sign Group

Pattison Food Group
 The Overwaitea Food Group
 Bulkley Valley Wholesale
 Coopers Foods
 Everything Wine
 More Rewards
 PriceSmart Foods
 Save-On-Foods
 Urban Fare
 Buy-Low Foods LP
 Choices Markets
 Nesters Markets
 Meinhardt Fine Foods
 Nature’s Fare
 Canadian Fishing Company
 Quality Foods
Roth's Fresh Markets

Pattison Media

Television stations
 Kamloops, British Columbia – CFJC-TV, Citytv affiliate
 Medicine Hat, Alberta – CHAT-TV, Citytv affiliate
 Prince George, British Columbia – CKPG-TV, Citytv affiliate

Radio stations
 Calgary, Alberta – CKWD-FM, CKCE-FM
 Chilliwack, British Columbia – CHWK-FM
 Courtenay/Comox/Campbell River, British Columbia – CKLR-FM
 Cranbrook, British Columbia – CHBZ-FM, CHDR-FM
 Drayton Valley/Rocky Mountain House, Alberta – CIBW-FM, CHBW-FM
 Edmonton, Alberta – CIUP-FM, CKNO-FM
 Fernie, British Columbia – CJDR-FM
 Grande Prairie, Alberta – CJXX-FM, CIKT-FM
 Kamloops, British Columbia – CKBZ-FM, CIFM-FM
 Kelowna, British Columbia – CKQQ-FM, CKLZ-FM
 Lethbridge, Alberta – CHLB-FM, CJBZ-FM
 Meadow Lake, Saskatchewan – CJNS-FM
 Medicine Hat, Alberta – CHAT-FM, CFMY-FM
 Melfort, Saskatchewan – CJVR-FM, CKJH
 Merritt, British Columbia – CKMQ-FM
 Nanaimo, British Columbia – CHWF-FM, CKWV-FM
 North Battleford, Saskatchewan – CJNB, CJCQ-FM, CJHD-FM
 Parksville/Qualicum Beach, British Columbia – CHPQ-FM, CIBH-FM
 Port Alberni, British Columbia – CJAV-FM
 Prince Albert, Saskatchewan – CFMM-FM, CHQX-FM, CKBI
 Prince George, British Columbia – CKDV-FM, CKKN-FM
 Red Deer, Alberta – CHUB-FM, CFDV-FM
 Vancouver, British Columbia – CJJR-FM, CKPK-FM
 Vernon, British Columbia – CJIB-FM
 Victoria, British Columbia – CJZN-FM, CKKQ-FM
 Whitecourt, Alberta – CIXM-FM
 Winnipeg, Manitoba – CHNW-FM, CFQX-FM

Other media properties
 Pattison Outdoor Advertising – the largest domestic Out-of-Home advertising company in Canada, with a 41% market share of all traditional out-of-home advertising displays

Periodical Distribution
 The News Group, North America's largest newspaper and magazine distributor; in November 2018, the company agreed to sell this group, and its entire United States magazine distribution business to American News Company, LLC. The Canadian periodicals division of The News Group, as well as the Non-Periodical's portion of The News Group remains a division of the Jim Pattison Group.
 Select Media Services

Entertainment
 Ripley Entertainment – Owners of the Ripley's Believe It or Not! franchise
 Guinness World Records

Automotive Group

The Jim Pattison Auto Group

Dealerships
Audi Edmonton North
Jim Pattison Chrysler Jeep Dodge Surrey
Jim Pattison Hyundai Coquitlam
Jim Pattison Hyundai Northshore
Jim Pattison Hyundai Surrey
Jim Pattison Lexus Northshore
Jim Pattison Lexus Victoria
Jim Pattison Subaru Coquitlam
Jim Pattison Subaru Northshore
Jim Pattison Subaru Victoria
Jim Pattison Subaru on Regent
Jim Pattison Subaru South
Jim Pattison Toyota Downtown
Jim Pattison Toyota Northshore
Jim Pattison Toyota Surrey
Jim Pattison Toyota Victoria
Jim Pattison Toyota Duncan
Jim Pattison Toyota on Regent
Jim Pattison Volkswagen Surrey
Jim Pattison Volvo of North Vancouver
Jim Pattison Volvo of Surrey
Canyon Creek Toyota

Body Shops
Jim Pattison Auto Body & Glass Surrey
Jim Pattison Toyota Surrey Auto Body & Glass
Jim Pattison Collision & Glass

Jim Pattison Lease
Canada's largest privately owned fleet management and leasing company.

The Jim Pattison Packaging Group
 GenPak – independent supplier of disposable food service packaging in the US and Canada.
 Coroplast – manufacturer and marketer of corrugated plastic sheet for the graphics and re-usable packaging industries
 Montebello Packaging – manufacturer of collapsible aluminum and laminate tubes, marker tubes, and rigid aluminum aerosol cans

Export and Financial Services
 Westshore Terminals – Canadian coal export facility and the largest dry bulk terminal on the West Coast of the Americas

References

External links
  of Jim Pattison Group
  of Jim Pattison Auto Group
 CRTC chart of Jim Pattison Group's broadcast assets
 Jim Pattison Group at the Canadian Communications Foundation website

 
Auto dealerships of Canada
Canadian brands
Conglomerate companies established in 1961
Conglomerate companies of Canada
Companies based in Vancouver
Television broadcasting companies of Canada
1961 establishments in British Columbia
Canadian companies established in 1961